Frederick Henry Schultz (January 16, 1929 – November 23, 2009) was an American businessman and politician who served as the 11th vice chairman of the Federal Reserve from 1979 to 1982. He served as the speaker of the Florida House of Representatives from 1968 to 1970.

Early life and education
Schultz graduated with an A.B. in history from Princeton University in 1951 after completing a senior thesis titled "A History of the Greyhound Corporation." Schultz served as an artillery officer in the United States Army during the Korean War from 1952 to 1954, and was awarded the Bronze Star. Schultz later attended the University of Florida College of Law, graduated with his law degree in 1956.

Career
Schultz was elected in Jacksonville and served in the Florida House of Representatives from 1963 to 1970; his last two years as Speaker.  President Jimmy Carter appointed him to the Board of Governors in 1979 and he was Vice Chair of the Federal Reserve until 1982.  In addition, he also served as Chairman of the Florida Institute of Education from 1983 to 1987.

On November 23, 2009, Schultz died of prostate cancer at his Jacksonville home at age 80.

References

External links
List of Vice Chairmen of the Federal Reserve System
Obituary
Harvard University background info
Statements and Speeches of Frederick Henry Schultz
Frederick H Schultz

1929 births
2009 deaths
20th-century American politicians
Carter administration personnel
Fredric G. Levin College of Law alumni
Politicians from Jacksonville, Florida
Princeton University alumni
Speakers of the Florida House of Representatives
Democratic Party members of the Florida House of Representatives
Reagan administration personnel
University of Florida alumni
Vice Chairs of the Federal Reserve